Columbus Technical College (commonly called Columbus Tech) is a two-year technical college located in Columbus, Georgia, United States. It is governed by Technical College System of Georgia.

References

External links
 Official website

Technical College System of Georgia
Education in Columbus, Georgia
Education in Muscogee County, Georgia
Educational institutions established in 1961
Universities and colleges accredited by the Southern Association of Colleges and Schools
1961 establishments in Georgia (U.S. state)